Ronny Reinhold Olander (born 1949) is a Swedish politician and former member of the Riksdag, the national legislature. A member of the Social Democratic Party, he represented Skåne County South between October 1994 and October 2010.

References

1949 births
Living people
Members of the Riksdag 1994–1998
Members of the Riksdag 1998–2002
Members of the Riksdag 2002–2006
Members of the Riksdag 2006–2010
Members of the Riksdag from the Social Democrats